Slaven Bilić (born 11 September 1968) is a Croatian professional football manager and former player. He was most recently manager of EFL Championship side Watford. 

Bilić, who played as a defender, began his career in 1988 with his hometown club Hajduk Split, later having successful spells with Karlsruher SC in Germany, and West Ham United and Everton in England before retiring from active football in 2001. At the international level, Bilić served as one of Croatia's most consistent defenders during the tenure of coach Miroslav Blažević, earning 44 caps between 1992 and 1999, and playing in UEFA Euro 1996 and the 1998 FIFA World Cup, helping the team to the third place at the latter tournament. 

Following his playing retirement in 2001 at Hajduk Split, Bilić coached the team in the second half of the 2001–02 season. Between 2004 and 2006, he managed the Croatia national under-21 team before taking over the senior national side. He led the team to the quarter-finals of the 2008 European Championship and left after the next edition four years later. He was praised for his long-standing service to the national side and credited with successfully overseeing the introduction of a series of young players from the under-21 squad to the senior side. He left for the Russian club Lokomotiv Moscow in 2012 and then spent two years apiece managing Turkish club Beşiktaş and West Ham United. During the 2018–19 season he was the head coach of Al-Ittihad, and on 13 June 2019 he became the manager of West Bromwich Albion. After this he became manager of Chinese team Beijing Guoan, before becoming manager of Watford in 2022.

Club career

Early life and Hajduk Split 
Almost all Hajduk juniors went to the economics school, so Bilić wanted to go as well. There were no classical grammar schools in Split, so he enrolled in information, journalism and documentary studies (INDOK). All throughout high school, Bilić ended up with the highest grades, so he graduated with Matura. His favorite subjects were maths and history. When he was choosing where to enroll in college, he already knew he would be a footballer. After graduating from high school, he completed his law faculty in Split, where his father was the dean.

As a Hajduk player, he was on loan for half a year at NK Primorac from Stobreč, and for one and a half a year in HNK Šibenik, which fought for the first place spot in the Yugoslav Second League. Bilić, as centre half, scored seven goals and played for the national team. Petar Nadoveza called him up for three matches: in Skopje, Niš and Mostar. He scored two goals and was declared man of the match in all three matches.

Bilić became the target of clubs such as Dinamo Zagreb, Red Star Belgrade and Partizan, which all wanted to acquire the young defender. He helped his club win the 1990–91 Yugoslav Cup before the dismantling of the Yugoslav First League. During the first season of the newly founded Croatian First League, Hajduk won the league and Super Cup. One season later, they also secured the Croatian Cup.

West Ham United 
In January 1996, Harry Redknapp, manager of Premier League club West Ham United, brought him to the club for a fee of £1.3 million, setting the club's record for highest fee paid for an incoming player. He made his debut on 12 February 1996 in a 0–1 away win against London rivals Tottenham Hotspur. Bilić's shot was saved by Tottenham goalkeeper Ian Walker only for West Ham's Dani, another debutant, to divert the ball into the Tottenham goal.

Bilić scored three goals in his time with West Ham: two in the Premier League, against Liverpool and Sunderland, and one in the League Cup against Barnet, heading-in from a Stan Lazaridis corner, his first for the club. He played 13 games in the 1995–96 season and 41 in the 1996–97 season, a season which also saw him voted a runner-up, to Julian Dicks, for the Hammer of the Year award.

In March 1997, Everton manager Joe Royle brokered a £4.5 million move, with Bilić claiming he had a debt of loyalty to West Ham to stay with the club until the end of the season to ensure they were not relegated. West Ham finished in 14th place, two points above the relegation places.

Everton 
Bilić turned out for Everton in August 1997 after assuring himself of new manager Howard Kendall's full support. He initially brought some class to the Toffees' backline, but his season was marred by bookings that saw him miss several games through suspension.

After his exertions in the 1998 World Cup, Bilić revealed a nagging groin strain that required rest and treatment, which he took back home in Croatia. After missing the first quarter of the season, Bilić was left wondering if he would get back into the Everton side managed by Walter Smith. He did so and showed some good form but could never fully establish himself due to injuries and suspensions.

Everton released Bilić in July 1999.

Hajduk Split 
Two days after being released by Everton, Bilić signed up with his home club Hajduk Split, where he briefly played until retiring. He led Hajduk as team captain to their first trophy in five years winning the Croatian Cup.

International career 
Bilić made his international debut on 5 July 1992 in a friendly match against Australia, in which they lost 1–0 at Olympic Park Stadium.

Bilić went into the 1998 World Cup with Croatia, where the team was the surprise package of the tournament, falling in the semi-finals to hosts France. Croatia finished in third place after winning the play-off game.

Bilić was involved in controversy during the tournament for the role he played in the dismissal of Laurent Blanc in the semi-final with France. With Croatia behind, a free kick was awarded, which saw Bilić marking the French defender. He held Blanc and to free himself, Blanc pushed Bilić, making contact with his chin and chest. Bilić fell to the ground clutching his forehead. Bilić later admitted that he was acting, and went down only after encouragement from teammate Igor Štimac. Blanc was sent off and missed the World Cup final through suspension. Bilić did not apologize but did say, "I swear if I could change that so Blanc could play in the final, I would."

Managerial career

Early days 
As a shareholder in his hometown club, Hajduk Split, he temporarily agreed to manage them until the club found a replacement manager. Having admitted that the adrenaline inspired him, he reportedly received guidance after travelling Europe and visiting Arsène Wenger and Marcello Lippi.

Croatia 
Bilić was appointed head coach of the senior national team on 25 July 2006, succeeding Zlatko Kranjčar after the unsuccessful 2006 World Cup. His assistants included former teammates Aljoša Asanović, Robert Prosinečki, Nikola Jurčević and Marjan Mrmić. One of his first actions in charge of the squad was the promotion of three players from the under-21 squad: Eduardo, Luka Modrić and Vedran Ćorluka, who would all eventually enjoy impressive success and make transfers to the Premier League. The team's first official game under Bilić was the 0–2 friendly win in Livorno against Italy, while Bilić's first competitive game was the goalless draw in Moscow against Russia in the opener for their Euro 2008 qualifying campaign. Many criticized this result due to Bilić's suspension of Darijo Srna, Ivica Olić and Boško Balaban, who escaped from camp three days before the match and went to the night club Fontana in Zagreb. It is likely that no one would have found out, but there was a gunfight and a police intervention.

Further in the Euro 2008 qualifiers, he led Croatia to a very successful campaign in a group consisting of England, Russia, Israel, Macedonia, Estonia, and Andorra. Bilić managed to lead Croatia to a first-place finish in Group E, most notably masterminding home and away victories against England, who consequently did not qualify and sacked their manager Steve McClaren.

At the Euro 2008 tournament itself, where he was the youngest coach, Bilić and the rest of his squad had to participate with a "handicap", as they were without their star striker Eduardo, who sustained a serious injury a few months earlier. Nonetheless, Bilić led his side to an outstanding achievement, as they won all three group stage games of the competition, taking maximum points in the group for the first time in their history, which included an impressive 2–1 victory over eventual finalists Germany. Even his side's second string reserve side was seen to be too strong for their final group opponents Poland, who they beat 1–0 due to an Ivan Klasnić goal. Croatia soon became labelled as favourites for the tournament, but suffered an exit in the quarter-finals against Turkey, and he admitted that the defeat would haunt him and his squad for the rest of their lives.

Croatia opened UEFA Euro 2012 with a 3–1 victory over the Republic of Ireland, with striker Mario Mandžukić scoring twice, and Mandžukić also scored an equaliser in the 1–1 draw against Italy. After a 1–0 defeat to Spain, Croatia exited the tournament in the group stage. However, the team subsequently garnered widespread domestic praise for their performance, and were greeted by a large crowd upon their return. Upon his formal departure, Bilić was also praised for his long-standing service to the national side. Domestic media outlet Jutarnji list labelled him as Croatia's only manager to depart on such positive terms and credited him for his strong revival of the national side during his six-year tenure.

Lokomotiv Moscow 
On 14 May 2012, it was confirmed that Bilić had signed a coaching contract with the Russian club Lokomotiv Moscow. Upon the confirmation of signing, Lokomotiv chairman Olga Smorodskaya stated that Lokomotiv had tough competition in signing Bilić, as he was targeted by many clubs around Europe who wanted to sign him as their new manager. Bilić took over the team after the Euro 2012 tournament had finished. His assistants included former teammates and former assistants during his tenure as manager in the national team, Aljoša Asanović and Nikola Jurčević. Upon his arrival he made his first big signing for the team, signing his ex-Croatian international player Vedran Ćorluka from Tottenham Hotspur for a fee of £5.5 million. His first official match as the new Lokomotiv manager came on 20 July 2012 in away match against Mordoviya Saransk, ending in 3–2 win for Lokomotiv. Bilić's first season as a manager ended with the Lokomotiv's worst league result, ninth place, since the establishment of Russian championship in 1992. Bilić accepted responsibility for Lokomotiv's failure and was sacked on 18 June 2013.

Beşiktaş 
After leaving Lokomotiv, Bilić entered talks to take over as Beşiktaş manager. The deal was confirmed on 26 June 2013 after an agreement to a three-year contract worth €4.8 million. Bilić signed the contract on 28 June. On 22 September, Bilić was sent-off from the bench by referee Fırat Aydınus during the İstanbul Derby against Galatasaray, after Bilić had complained about the amount of time added by the referee. Beşiktaş president Fikret Orman announced on 21 May 2015 that Bilić would leave the club at the end of the 2014–15 season.

West Ham United 

Bilić was appointed manager of English Premier League club West Ham United on 9 June 2015 on a three-year contract. In his first Premier League game on 9 August, his team beat Arsenal 2–0 at the Emirates Stadium. Three weeks later, he became the first manager to lead West Ham to victory against Liverpool at Anfield since 1963. On 19 September, Bilić led West Ham to a third successive 1–2 away win against Manchester City. It was the first time the Hammers had won three successive Premier League away games since September 2007, and only three other sides had recorded away wins at Arsenal, Liverpool and Manchester City in the same Premier League season. In Bilić's first season as manager, West Ham finished seventh in the Premier League and towards the end of the season, they beat Manchester United 3–2 in May and significantly lowered United's hope of finishing in top 4 for qualification for the UEFA Championship League place. The team broke several records for the club in the Premier League era, including the highest number of points with 62, the highest number of goals in a season with 65, a positive goal difference for the first time in the Premier League with +14, the fewest games lost in a season with eight and the fewest away defeats with five.

Following Manchester United's win in the 2016 FA Cup Final, West Ham took their UEFA Europa League place and qualified for the third qualifying round of the 2016–17 UEFA Europa League. For the second season in a row they were eliminated in the qualifying rounds by Romanian side FC Astra Giurgiu. In his second season in charge West Ham finished 11th in the Premier League in a challenging debut season at the London Stadium following the acrimonious departure of star player, Dimitri Payet.

After a run of poor results in the Premier League, culminating in a 4–1 home loss to Liverpool on 4 November 2017, Bilić was sacked. The announcement, made two days after the game, stated that "West Ham United can confirm that Slaven Bilic has today left his position with the club. West Ham United believe a change is now necessary in order for the club to move forward positively and in line with their ambition." He left the team with a record of 1.33 points per Premier League game, which is the best of any previous West Ham manager.

Al-Ittihad 
On 27 September 2018, Bilić joined Al-Ittihad of the Saudi Professional League. On 24 February 2019, after five months as manager of Al-Ittihad and after winning only 6 of his 20 matches, Bilić got sacked from the position.

West Bromwich Albion 
On 13 June 2019, Bilić was named as head coach of West Bromwich Albion on a two-year contract. On 22 July 2020, he led the club to promotion back to the Premier League, finishing as runner-up in the 2019–20 EFL Championship.

On 22 September, Bilić was charged with 'improper conduct' by the FA, after remonstrating with referee Mike Dean during his team's 5–2 defeat to Everton a few days before.

On 16 December, despite a surprise 1–1 draw against Manchester City, Bilić was sacked by the club after a poor start to the season. His fellow coaching staff were also dismissed. At the time, West Brom were 19th in the league, having taken just seven points from 13 games.

Beijing Guoan 
On 6 January 2021, Bilić was named as head coach of Chinese Super League side Beijing Guoan on a two-year contract.

On 8 January 2022, Bilić parted ways with Beijing Guoan.

Watford 
On 26 September 2022, Bilić became manager of Watford on an 18-month contract. In his first game in charge, on 2 October, Watford won 4–0 away to Stoke City.

On 7 March 2023, Bilić was sacked with the club sitting in ninth position, four points below the play-offs places. In a statement the club noted the Hornets had won just once in the last eight Championship games.

Coaching style 
Bilić has said in a post tournament interview that he and his players compiled and studied many games of their opponents to become very well prepared for tough matches.

Known to be a big fan of music, Bilić relates his teams motivation to such, often encouraging them to listen to inspiring music before and after games.

Personal life 

Along with his native Croatian, Bilić is fluent in German, Italian and English, while he also holds a degree in law. As a big fan of rock music, he plays rhythm guitar with his favoured red Gibson Explorer and is a member of Rawbau, a Croatian rock band. In 2008, the band recorded a song for Croatia's performance at Euro 2008 called "Vatreno ludilo" (Fiery Madness).

Career statistics

Club

International 
Source:

Results list Croatia's goal tally first.

Managerial

Honours

Player 
Hajduk Split
Croatian First League: 1992
Yugoslav Cup: 1990–91
Croatian Cup: 1992–93, 1999–2000
Croatian Super Cup: 1992

Croatia
FIFA World Cup third-place: 1998

Manager 
West Bromwich Albion
EFL Championship runner-up: 2019–20

Individual 
Prva HNL Player of the Year: 1992
Best Croatian footballer of 1997 by Novi list
Best Croatian footballer of 1997 by Sportske novosti
Ivica Jobo Kurtini Award: 1997
Franjo Bučar State Award for Sport: 1998 (as player), 2007 (as manager)
Media Servis person of the year: 2007
Vatrena krila heart of the supporters Award: 2014
Saudi Professional League Manager of the Month: January 2019

Orders 
 Order of Danica Hrvatska with face of Franjo Bučar – 1995
 Order of the Croatian Trefoil – 1998

References

External links 

Slaven Bilić at ToffeeWeb.com

1968 births
Living people
Footballers from Split, Croatia
Yugoslav footballers
Croatian footballers
Association football central defenders
NK Primorac 1929 players
HNK Šibenik players
HNK Hajduk Split players
Karlsruher SC players
Everton F.C. players
West Ham United F.C. players
Yugoslav First League players
Croatian Football League players
Bundesliga players
Premier League players
Croatia international footballers
UEFA Euro 1996 players
1998 FIFA World Cup players
Croatian expatriate footballers
Croatian expatriate sportspeople in Germany
Croatian expatriate sportspeople in England
Expatriate footballers in Germany
Expatriate footballers in England
Croatian football managers
HNK Hajduk Split managers
Croatia national under-21 football team managers
Croatia national football team managers
FC Lokomotiv Moscow managers
Beşiktaş J.K. managers
West Ham United F.C. managers
Ittihad FC managers
West Bromwich Albion F.C. managers
Beijing Guoan F.C. managers
Watford F.C. managers
Croatian Football League managers
Russian Premier League managers
Süper Lig managers
Premier League managers
Saudi Professional League managers
English Football League managers
Chinese Super League managers
UEFA Euro 2008 managers
UEFA Euro 2012 managers
Croatian expatriate football managers
Croatian expatriate sportspeople in Russia
Croatian expatriate sportspeople in Turkey
Croatian expatriate sportspeople in Saudi Arabia
Croatian expatriate sportspeople in China
Expatriate football managers in Russia
Expatriate football managers in Turkey
Expatriate football managers in England
Expatriate football managers in Saudi Arabia
Expatriate football managers in China
Franjo Bučar Award winners
University of Split alumni
Croatian socialists